In human anatomy, the dorsal veins of the penis comprise the superficial dorsal vein of the penis and the deep dorsal vein of the penis.

Superficial dorsal vein
The superficial dorsal vein of the penis drains the prepuce and skin of the penis, and, running backward in the subcutaneous tissue, inclines to the right or left, and opens into the corresponding superficial external pudendal vein, a tributary of the great saphenous vein.

In contrast to the deep dorsal vein, it lies outside Buck's fascia.

It is possible for the vein to rupture, which presents in a manner similar to penile fracture.

Deep dorsal vein
The deep dorsal vein of the penis lies beneath the deep fascia of the penis; it receives the blood from the glans penis and corpora cavernosa penis and courses backward in the middle line between the dorsal arteries; near the root of the penis it passes between the two parts of the suspensory ligament and then through an aperture between the arcuate pubic ligament and the transverse ligament of the pelvis, and divides into two branches, which enter the vesical and prostatic plexuses.

The deep vein also communicates below the pubic symphysis with the internal pudendal vein.

Clinical significance 
The dorsal veins of the penis can be used for intravenous injections in rats.

In popular culture
The surface pattern of the Snickers candy bar has been compared to the appearance of the dorsal veins of the penis, colloquially referred to as "dick veins". In April 2022, a Twitter user satirically claimed in a viral tweet that Snickers was removing the "dick vein" design from the top of the candy bar, prompting a backlash from unwitting Snickers fans. Due to the volume of response, Snickers clarified in its own viral tweet that the "veins remain".

Additional images

References

External links
 

Veins of the torso
Human penis anatomy